Shahrak-e Bostan (also Romanized as Shahrak-e Bostān) is a village in Abshur Rural District, Forg District, Darab County, Fars Province, Iran. At the 2006 census, its population was 418, in 81 families.

References 

Populated places in Darab County